Senthil Krishna is an Indian actor known for roles in Malayalam films and Television. He had the lead role in the film Chalakkudykkaran Changathy.

Personal life

He married Akhila from Calicut on 24 August 2019 at Guruvayoor Sreekrishna Temple.

Filmography

All films are in Malayalam language unless otherwise noted.

Films

TV serials

References

External links
 

Living people
Indian male film actors
1986 births